Ivan Mikhailovich Gvozdev (May 12, 1859 in Nikolsky Uyezd, Vologda Governorate – 1932 in Vologda Oblast) was a priest (father), a deputy of the clergy in his governorate and a deputy of the Fourth Imperial Duma from the Vologda Governorate between 1912 and 1917. He had right political position. After the February Revolution of 1917, he returned to his homeland; in 1931 his house and all his property were confiscated.

Literature 
 Николаев А. Б. Гвоздев Иоанн Михайлович (in Russian) // Государственная дума Российской империи: 1906—1917 / Б. Ю. Иванов, А. А. Комзолова, И. С. Ряховская. — Москва: РОССПЭН, 2008. — P. 122. — 735 p. — .
 Гвоздев (in Russian) // Члены Государственной думы (портреты и биографии): Четвертый созыв, 1912—1917 г. / сост. М. М. Боиович. — Москва: Тип. Т-ва И. Д. Сытина, 1913. — P. 35. — LXIV, 454, [2] p. 
 Разные известия по епархии // Вологодские епархиальные ведомости : Изд. Вологодской духовной консистории / Ред. И. Н. Суворов. — Вологда: типография Губернского Правления, 1898. — 1 октября (№ 19). — P. 229—231. (in Russian)

1859 births
1932 deaths
People from Vologda Oblast
People from Nikolsky Uyezd
Russian Eastern Orthodox priests
Members of the 4th State Duma of the Russian Empire